Chlormephos (chemical formula: C5H12ClO2PS2) is an organothiophosphate insecticide. It is classified as an extremely hazardous substance in the United States as defined in Section 302 of the U.S. Emergency Planning and Community Right-to-Know Act (42 U.S.C. 11002), and is subject to strict reporting requirements by facilities which produce, store, or use it in significant quantities.

Chloromephos exhibits its toxic effects via the inhibition of the enzyme acetylcholinesterase, this is the same mechanism of action as the notorious chemical weapons known as V-series nerve agents.

References

Organothiophosphate esters
Insecticides